Round Room is the tenth studio album by the American rock band Phish released on December 10, 2002, by Elektra Records.

The album was recorded over the span of four days in October 2002, and its release marked the end of the group's two year hiatus from touring and recording.

Production and release
Initially, Phish planned to record the album live at their December 31, 2002 concert at Madison Square Garden in New York City, their first concert since October 2000, but they decided instead to release the songs they had recorded that fall instead.

As with previous Phish albums, the songs originated in collaborative writing sessions between frontman Trey Anastasio and lyricist Tom Marshall (with two songs contributed by bass guitarist Mike Gordon). Round Room is unique, however, in that the final tracks were taken from the band's unedited rehearsal sessions at The Barn, Anastasio's studio in Vermont. Rolling Stone notes that this approach gives the album a "decidedly live" feeling, and "breathes with an anxious, edge-of-the-seat intensity that's missing from their previous studio efforts." Though largely positive, the review criticizes Anastasio's singing and the "Phishspeak" quality of the lyrics.

In the liner notes for the album, Round Room is dedicated to the memory of Widespread Panic guitarist Michael Houser, who died in August 2002, and Scott Schertzer, a Phish fan who was killed in the September 11 attacks in 2001.

Phish appeared on TV twice before their official return to the stage on New Year's Eve 2002. "46 Days" was debuted live on the December 14, 2002, episode of Saturday Night Live, and "All of These Dreams" debuted five days later on the Late Show with David Letterman.

About a week after the release of Round Room, Phish recorded an impromptu jam session in a studio in New York City, excerpts of which were later scheduled for release as The Victor Disc. However, this instrumental album has not yet been officially released.

Track listing

Personnel
Phish
Trey Anastasio – guitars, lead vocals
Page McConnell – keyboards, backing vocals, co-lead vocals (tracks 6, 12)
Mike Gordon – bass guitar, backing vocals, lead vocals (tracks 3, 5, 7)
Jon Fishman – drums, backing vocals

References

External links
Phish's official website

2002 albums
Phish albums
LivePhish.com Downloads
Elektra Records albums